The Wilsterau is a river of Schleswig-Holstein, Germany. It is a right tributary of the Stör near Wilster.

See also
List of rivers of Schleswig-Holstein

Rivers of Schleswig-Holstein
Rivers of Germany